The Road Ahead is a compilation album by Bradley Joseph containing songs from his albums One Deep Breath, Solo Journey, The Journey Continues, and Hear the Masses.

Track listing
"Rose Colored Glasses"  
"Wildflowers"  
"The Gift"  
"If I could Fly" 
"Wind Farmer"  
"Dreamers Lullaby" 
"Fridays Child"  
"Is This A Dream"  
"In The Heart Of Everyone"  
"A Moments Rest"  
"The Road Ahead"   
"Seasons End"  
"Dancers Waltz" 
"Letters From Home"

Personnel
All music composed, produced, and performed by Bradley Joseph.

References

External links
Official Website
The Road Ahead at Orange Music
The Road Ahead at Discogs

Bradley Joseph albums
2004 compilation albums
Instrumental compilation albums